Khwaab Nagar Ki Shehzadi is a Pakistani television family soap series aired on ARY Digital from 8 February 2021 to 10 July 2021. It is produced by Abdullah Seja under IDream Entertainment. It stars Mikaal Zulfiqar, Mashal Khan and Anmol Baloch in lead roles. The story revolves around a young, pretty, and ambitious maid Sehar (Anmol Baloch), who wants to get rich by any means possible even if it means by luring her employer's husband Saim (Mikaal Zulfiqar); a devoted husband, who later gets smitten with the maid and cheats his wife, Meera (Mashal Khan).

The drama received mixed reviews from the viewers, receiving positive response for intriguing plot of the serial along with praise for Baloch and Khan's character's and their acting skills.

Cast

Main cast
Mikaal Zulfiqar as Saim
Mashal Khan as Dr.Meera
Anmol Baloch as Sehar

Supporting cast
Sajida Syed as Asma,Amjad and Saim's mother
Shaheen Khan as Meera and Saman's mother
Nayyar Ejaz as Jamil Khan: Sehar and Samina's father
Ayesha Toor as Asma: Amjad and Saim's sister
Alyy Khan as Amjad: Asma and Saim's elder brother
Ayesha Gul as Naila: Amjad's wife
Nazli Nasr as Shamim: Sehar and Samina's mother
Aidah Shaikh as Samina: Sehar's elder sister
Qasim Khan as Imran: Samina's husband
Ramsha Salahuddin as Saman: Meeea's sister and love interest of Hamza
Ammad Mohammad Khan as Hamza
Umair Leghari as Munir: Asma's husband
Farzana Thaheem as Imran's mother
Shazia Gohar as Hamza's mother
Arsala Siddiqui as Farah
Kainat Kazmi as Seema: Hamza's sister
Uzair Ahmed Abbasi
Umair Rafiq as Fahad

Guest appearance
Sohail Masood as Shahid: police officer who's Saim's friend
Salma Qadir as Bashir's wife: caretaker of Shamim on her death bed

Child stars
Ahmed Usman as Hassan: Saim and Meera's son
Esha Usman as Fizza: Amjad and Naila's daughter
Ayan as Owais: Asma and Munir son
Hoorain as Yumna: Asma and Munir daughter

Production

Casting
In 2020, it was reported that Mikaal Zulfiqar is going to make appearance with Mashal and Anmol as female leads for IDream Entertainment serial. Senior actors Sajida Syed, Nayyar Ejaz, Shaheen Khan and Nazli Nasr were also cast for the serial. However, Nasr made appearance in initial 9 episodes only. Ayesha Toor and Omair Leghari joined the cast from eleven episode onwards.

References

ARY Digital original programming
Pakistani television series
2021 Pakistani television series debuts
2021 Pakistani television series endings